Bhagwat may refer to:

Bhagavata Purana, one of the Puranic texts of Hinduism
Bhagwat (surname), a surname native to India

See also
21351 Bhagwat (1997 EC36), a Main-belt Asteroid discovered in 1997
Madhavrao Bhagwat High School, a co-educational school located in a suburb of Mumbai